Werner Schröer (12 February 1918 – 10 February 1985) was a German World War II fighter ace credited with shooting down 114 enemy aircraft. He served in the Luftwaffe from 1937, initially as a member of the ground staff, until the end of World War II in Europe on 8 May 1945, by which time he had reached the highest ranks of combat leadership. Schröer was the second most successful claimant of air victories after Hans-Joachim Marseille in the Mediterranean, and was decorated with the Knight's Cross of the Iron Cross with Oak Leaves and Swords.

Early life and career
Schröer was born on 12 February 1918 in Mülheim an der Ruhr, at the time in the Rhine Province of the Kingdom of Prussia. He was the son of Friedrich Johann Schröer and his wife Maria, née Schmitz. Schröer attended school from 1924 to 1937 and graduated with his Abitur (School Leaving Certificate). From April to October 1937, he then completed the compulsory Reichsarbeitsdienst (Reich Labour Service). Schröer joined the military service with the Luftwaffe of Nazi Germany in 1937. His recruit training began on 3 November 1937 with the 4. Kompanie (4th company) of Fliegerersatzabteilung 24 (24th Flier Replacement Unit) in Quakenbrück. On 1 April 1938, he was transferred to the Flughafenbetriebskompanie (Airport Operation Company) of Jagdgeschwader 132 (JG 132—132nd Fighter Wing) to Düsseldorf, serving with the ground personnel.

On 1 July 1938, Schröer was posted to the 7. Staffel (7th squadron) of Jagdgeschwader 234 (JG 234th—234th Fighter Wing) where his flight training began. He then served with the Fliegerhorstkompanie (Airfield Company) in Düsseldorf from 13 August 1938 to 30 June 1939. While serving with this unit, he was promoted to Gefreiter (airman first class) on 1 October 1938 and to Unteroffizier (corporal) on 1 April 1939. On 1 July 1939, Schröer was then transferred to II. Gruppe (2nd group) of Jagdgeschwader 26 "Schlageter" (JG 26—26th Fighter Wing), named after the Nazi martyr Albert Leo Schlageter, where he was posted to the 6. Staffel where he made his first flight. From 1 September to 15 October 1939, Schröer attended an air observer course at the Aufklärungsfliegerschule (Reconnaissance Flying School) at Hildesheim. Schröer then continued his pilot training at the flight schools in Kamp and Schafstädt . On 16 May 1940, he completed his flight training with Flugkommando 23 (Flight Commando) in Braunschweig. During this training period, he was promoted to Feldwebel (sergeant) on 1 December 1939. Schröer then received fighter pilot training at the Jagdfliegerschule 1 (fighter pilot school) at Werneuchen. There he learned to fly the Arado Ar 68 and Ar 96, the Messerschmitt Bf 108 and Bf 109, the Bücker Bü 131, the Focke-Wulf Fw 56, and the Heinkel He 45 and He 51. From 22 July to 17 August 1940, Schröer completed his fighter pilot training with the 2. Staffel of Ergänzungsjagdgruppe Merseburg, a supplementary training unit based in Merseburg.

World War II
World War II in Europe began on Friday 1 September 1939 when German forces invaded Poland. On 20 August 1940, Schröer was transferred to the 2. Staffel of Jagdgeschwader 27 (JG 27—27th Fighter Wing), a front line fighter unit. JG 27 at the time was under the command of Oberst (Colonel) Max Ibel and based in Plumetot, France on the Channel Front. There, JG 27 was subordinated to Jagdfliegerführer 3 (Jafü 3), the fighter force commander of Luftflotte 3 under the command of Generalfeldmarschall (Field Marshal) Hugo Sperrle, and fought in the Battle of Britain (10 July – 31 October 1940). Operating over the English Channel and southern England, Schröer flew his first combat missions and claimed three aerial victories which were not confirmed.

I. Gruppe was withdrawn from the Channel Front on 30 September 1940. Relocation to Stade, west of Hamburg, began on 1 October. There, I. Gruppe was placed under the command of Geschwaderstab of Jagdgeschwader 1 (JG 1—1st Fighter Wing). During the following three weeks, I. Gruppe was tasked with flying combat air patrols over the German Bight. In parallel, the Gruppe replenished its losses of 14 men killed or missing in action, four wounded and seven taken prisoner of war, losses sustained while fighting over Britain. Also the losses in aircraft had to be replenished and the equipment underwent a maintenance overhaul. On 21 October, I. Gruppe was again ordered to France, then based at Dinan in northeastern Brittany under the command of Jafü 3 again. On 3 December, I. Gruppe relocated again, this time to Döberitz with the orders to provide fighter protection for Berlin. Following the arrival in Döberitz, the majority of the flying and ground personnel were sent on vacation. Between end-February to early March 1941, the I. Gruppe relocated to Munich-Riem where it stayed for four weeks. On 24 February, the pilots of 1. and 2. Staffel were temporarily sent to Sicily where they flew missions against Malta, protecting the German naval convoys taking the Afrika Korps to Tripoli. During this period, 2. Staffel was based at Comiso. From 7 to 10 March, the pilots returned to Munich-Riem. During this brief interlude, Schröer was promoted to Leutnant (second lieutenant) and transferred to 1. Staffel on 1 March. On 4 April 1941, the Gruppe relocated to Graz in preparation of operation Operation Marita, the Battle of Greece. On 11 April, I. Gruppe flew fighter escort missions for Junkers Ju 87 dive bombers in this campaign. The next day, the unit deployed to Zagreb before transferring to Africa.

North Africa
On 15 April 1941, the first elements of 1. and 2. Staffel began relocation to North Africa to Tripoli. From Tripoli, the Staffeln were ordered to Ain el Gazala airfield, west of Tobruk, where they arrived between 18 and 24 April 1941. Schröer was credited with his first aerial victory on 19 April, a Royal Air Force (RAF) Hawker Hurricane fighter of the No. 274 Squadron shot down near Tobruk. That day, the Gruppe claimed its first four victories in Africa. In this encounter, Schröer was shot down in his Bf 109 E-7 (Werknummer 3790—factory number), resulting in a forced landing at Ain el Gazala. Schröer's victor was Pilot Officer Spence. Schröer was the first German Bf 109 pilot shot down in Africa. For this, Schröer was awarded the Iron Cross 2nd Class. Two days later, on 21 April, I. Gruppe engaged in combat with Hurricane fighters over Tobruk, claiming one victory by Oberfeldwebel Albert Espenlaub for the loss of Unteroffizier Hans Sippel who was killed in action. Schröer's Bf 109 E-7 (Werknummer 4170—factory number) also sustained combat damage in this encounter. He managed to fly his aircraft back to Ain el Gazala, making another forced landing and slightly injuring himself. It is possible that his victor was Pilot Officer Spence, making it the second time in 48 hours the RAF pilot shot him down.

Schröer claimed his second aerial victory over two months later. On 25 June, he claimed a Hurricane shot down, presumably from 2 Squadron of the South African Air Force (SAAF). On 19 July 1941, a flight of three Schwärme, flights of four aircraft, from I. Gruppe encountered a mixed flight of Hurricanes and P-40 "Tomahawk" fighters on a combat air patrol north of Sidi Barrani. Twelve Hurricanes from No. 73 Squadron RAF, augmented by P-40s from 2 Squadron SAAF, provided fighter escort for Allied shipping destined for Tobruk. In this encounter, the Germans claimed three victories without sustaining any losses. Schröer was credited with his fourth victory that day, a P-40 claimed at 18:17 northeast Ras Asaz. On 21 August, Schröer claimed his fifth victory, a Hurricane from No. 229 Squadron on an escort mission for a flight of Martin Maryland bombers from 24 Squadron SAAF on a bombing mission to Menastir, near Bardia.

On 29 August 1941, Schröer engaged in aerial combat with the top Australian ace Clive Caldwell of No. 250 Squadron RAF north-west of Sidi Barrani. In the course of the battle Schröer damaged Caldwell's P-40 "Tomahawk". Caldwell suffered bullet wounds to the back, left shoulder, and leg but was still able to shoot down Schröer's wingman and heavily damage Schröer's own aircraft and thus forced him to disengage. According to Prien, Rodeike and Stemmer, authors of Messerschmidt Bf 109 im Einsatz bei Stab und I./Jagdgeschwader 27, 1939 – 1945 [Messerschmidt Bf 109 in Action with the Headquarters Unit and I./Jagdgeschwader 27, 1939 – 1945], I. Gruppe did not record any loss or damaged aircraft in this encounter.

The arrival in September of II. Gruppe from the Eastern Front allowed I./JG 27 to rotate its pilots back to Germany, a squadron at a time, for rest and re-equipment with the improved Bf 109 F. However, this could not prevent the Axis forces being routed out of Cyrenaica by the British Operation Crusader.

Staffelkapitän
In February, Rommel launched his counter-offensive retaking a lot of the same ground all over again. On 1 March 1942, when Werner became adjutant in I./JG 27 learning command under the experienced Eduard Neumann, they were back at Martuba, east of Derna. On 22 June, the day after the fall of Tobruk, he was promoted to Staffelkapitän of 8./JG 27, based further forward at Gazala. The next day, 23 June, with Marseille having just reached 101 victories, Werner scored his 12th and finally started scoring regularly. With the Battle of Gazala well underway, and Rommel charging 500 km onto El Alamein, the airwar finally heated up. He scored 16 victories in July, then after a month away, a further 13 victories bringing his total to 44. On 9 September he was awarded the German Cross in Gold after his 32nd & 33rd victories the day before. The claims submitted by JG 27 on 15 September are a matter of controversy. Some 26 claims were submitted for aircraft shot down by JG 27—six by Schröer. In fact only five Allied aircraft were shot down in aerial combat that day.

On 30 September 1942, Schröer was leading 8. Staffel on a Stuka escort mission covering the withdrawal of the group and relieving the outward escort, III./Jagdgeschwader 53 (JG 53—53rd Fighter Wing), which had been deployed to support JG 27 in Africa. Hans-Joachim Marseille's 3. Staffel visually sighted the RAF fighters but were unable to make contact. Marseille vectored Schröer onto the enemy aircraft. Marseille heard Schröer claim a Spitfire over the radio at 10:30. Both flights remained airborne over the next hour on patrol. At 11:30 Marseille radioed his engine was smoking and his flight escorted him to German lines. Marseille bailed out but struck the vertical stabilizer and fell to earth without his parachute deploying. Schröer arrived near 3 staffel in time to see Marseille's Bf 109 hit the ground but saw no parachute. He later learned of Marseille's death.

He continued claiming regularly in October, downing a further 15 aircraft. Leutnant Schröer was awarded the Knight's Cross of the Iron Cross on 21 October for 49 victories, just before Montgomery launched his victorious Battle of El Alamein. In the frantic air battles overhead, Schroer shot down 10 aircraft in a week. On 4 November, the new Oberleutnant Schröer shot down his first four-engined bomber - a Consolidated B-24 Liberator - west of Sollum. However, the end in Africa was nigh, and with the Afrika Korps in full retreat, III./JG 27 handed over its aircraft to Jagdgeschwader 77 (the 77th Fighter Wing) replacing it on the continent, and evacuated to Crete and the Aegean islands. Fittingly, as the Gruppe's highest scorer, Werner scored one of its last African victories on 16 November (his 61st). Those 61 victories, all scored in Africa, made him the second-highest scoring ace of the Desert War, after Marseille (who had been killed in a flying accident on 30 September with 158 victories).

In the few months they were in the Aegean, including a posting with the Italian forces on Rhodes, the newly promoted Hauptmann Schroer shot down two light bombers on 15 February. After that he had extended leave at home for his wedding.

Sicily and Italy

On 22 April 1943, a number of command position were changed, impacting Schröer. The Geschwaderkommodore (wing commander), Eduard Neumann was ordered to the staff of the General der Jagdflieger  (General of Fighters) Adolf Galland. The vacancy in the Geschwaderkommodore position was back-filled by the Gruppenkommandeur (group commander) of II./JG 27, Gustav Rödel who surrendered his command to Schröer. II./JG 27 was now operating with the new Bf 109G in the dangerous skies over Sicily, as the Allies prepared for invasion with heavy preparatory bombing raids. Based at Trapani, on the western corner of the island, they were up against complete Allied air superiority and had the hopeless task of trying to protect transport aircraft making desperate evacuation flights of remaining wounded and specialists out of the beleaguered Afrika Korps, now bottled up in Tunis. Just before Schroer took over command, on the evening of 18 April, only 6 transports had made it to Sicily out of 65 leaving Tunis. Flying at sea level, half had been shot down and the remainder turned back damaged. Powerless to help, II./JG 27 claimed only one enemy fighter in response. However, with renewed vigour Werner led from the front and over the next two months, claimed 22 Allied aircraft shot down, including 12 four-engined heavy bombers. The surrender in May of the Afrika Korps was of a comparable scale to the surrender of 6. Armee at Stalingrad only a few months earlier. Operation Husky, the Allied invasion of Sicily, started on 10 July. Unable to influence the result to any great degree, II./JG 27 had already been ordered back to the Italian mainland.

On 28 July, the unit was ordered to hand its aircraft over to other units and the pilots and crews returned to Germany for much-needed rest and re-equipment. At Foggia, the remaining aircraft were handed over to Jagdgeschwader 3 (JG 3—3rd Fighter Wing), Jagdgeschwader 53 (JG 53—53rd Fighter Wing) and Jagdgeschwader 77 (JG 77—77th Fighter Wing). The pilots took a train to Vienna-Aspern. On 2 August, Schröer was awarded the Knight's Cross of the Iron Cross with Oak Leaves, his tally at the time was 85 victories. The presentation was made by Adolf Hitler at the Wolf's Lair, Hitler's headquarters in Rastenburg, present-day Kętrzyn in Poland. Five other Luftwaffe officers were presented with awards that day by Hitler, Hauptmann Egmont Prinz zur Lippe-Weißenfeld, Hauptmann Manfred Meurer, Hauptmann Heinrich Ehrler, Oberleutnant Joachim Kirschner, Oberleutnant Theodor Weissenberger were also awarded the Oak Leaves, and Major Helmut Lent received the Swords to his Knight's Cross with Oak Leaves.

In defense of the Reich
In August 1943, II./JG 27 was at Wiesbaden-Erbenheim in Germany, starting training for a completely different air-war: Reichsverteidigung (Defense of the Reich) duties, at high altitude against the big, heavily armed massed-formations of four-engined bombers, or Viermots. From August to March, Schroer shot down 14 aircraft, 11 of them being Viermots - an indication of the type of air-combat in which he was now fighting. The unit's first operational sortie in the Reich, 6 September, was their most successful with nine bombers claimed, including three for Schröer (86-88v.)

On 7 January 1944, Schröer was credited with the destruction of a P-38 Lightning piloted by Joseph P. Marsiglia of the 55th Fighter Group, 338th Fighter Squadron. Marsiglia had to bail out and was apprehended near Holz in the district of Saarbrücken. This was Schröer's 92nd aerial victory. On 14 March 1944, Schröer was appointed Gruppenkommandeur, III./Jagdgeschwader 54 (JG 54—54th Fighter Wing). At the time, the Gruppe was based at Lüneburg Airfield and subordinated to 2. Jagd-Division (2nd Fighter Division). On 20 April, III. Gruppe relocated to Landau an der Isar for conversion training to the Focke Wulf Fw 190. In consequence of this relocation, the Gruppe came under the control of 7. Jagd-Division (7th Fighter Division). Conversion training was relatively short and the Gruppe flew its first mission on the Fw 190 against attacking United States Army Air Forces (USAAF) heavy bombers on 19 May.

On 24 May, Schröer claimed a P-51 Mustang and two P-47 Thunderbolts to reach his century (100–102v.). He was the 73rd Luftwaffe pilot to achieve the century mark. When Allied forces launched Operation Overlord, the invasion of German-occupied Western Europe on 6 June, III. Gruppe was immediately ordered to relocate to Villacoublay Airfield. That day, the Gruppe reached Nancy, arriving in Villacoublay the following day where it was subordinated to II. Fliegerkorps (2nd Air Corps). Its primary objective was to fly fighter-bomber missions in support of the German ground forces. The Gruppe flew its first missions on 7 June to the combat area east of Caen and the Orne estuary. But the worsening situation and the intense pressure was taking its toll, and he was sent on a month's stress-leave in early June just as Allied attention turned to Normandy, possibly saving his life as the unit took very heavy losses in France. On 6 June, he was temporarily replaced by Hauptmann Robert Weiß as commander of III. Gruppe and officially replaced by Weiß on 21 June.

Returning to duty, from 5 November 1944 to 5 February 1945, Schröer was senior instructor at the Verbandsführerschule (Training School for Unit Leaders) of the General der Jagdflieger (General of Fighters) at Königsberg in der Neumark, present-day Chojna in western Poland. In mid-February 1945, Schröer assumed command of JG 3 "Udet", named after Ernst Udet, from Oberstleutnant Heinrich Bär who had transferred to jet fighters. On 14 February, Schröer was officially appointed Geschwaderkommodore (wing commander) of JG 3 "Udet". The Geschwader was deployed in eastern Germany, initially subordinated to Luftflotte 6 and then under Luftwaffenkommando Nordost, where it fought over the lower Oder in the Battle of the Oder–Neisse. There, he claimed 12 Soviet aircraft destroyed - his only victories not on the Western Front. On 19 April 1945, he received the Knight's Cross of the Iron Cross with Oak Leaves and Swords. The Geschwaderstab (headquarters unit) withdrew along the Baltic coast into Schleswig-Holstein. There, on 5 May 1945, Schröer surrendered to British forces and was taken prisoner of war.

Later life

Schröer was kept in British custody until 7 February 1946. Initially he worked as a Taxicab driver in Frankfurt to help finance his family. In parallel, he attended university attaining a Master of Business Administration. Together with his family, he then lived and worked in Rome, Italy for eleven years. In 1968, the spelling of his last name changed from Schroer to Schröer, with the Umlaut "ö". Prior to his retirement, he held the position of head of the central protocol department with Messerschmitt-Bölkow-Blohm in Ottobrunn. Schröer died on 10 February 1985 in Ottobrunn, aged 66. He was buried with military honors at the Parkfriedhof (park cemetery) in Ottobrunn on 15 February 1985.

Summary of career

Aerial victory claims
According to US historian David T. Zabecki, Schröer was credited with 114 aerial victories. Obermaier also lists Schröer with 114 enemy aircraft shot down claimed in 197 combat missions, the majority of which on the Western Front, including 61 in North Africa and 22 in Italy. This figure includes 26 four-engined bombers, four of which claimed as Herausschüsse (separation shots). Mathews and Foreman, authors of Luftwaffe Aces – Biographies and Victory Claims, researched the German Federal Archives and found records for 106 aerial victory claims, plus eight further unconfirmed claims. This figure includes 12 aerial victories on the Eastern Front and 94 over the Western Allies, including 23 four-engine bomber.

Awards
 Wound Badge in Black
 Front Flying Clasp of the Luftwaffe in Gold
 in Silver (15 September 1941)
 in Gold (15 September 1942)
 Combined Pilots-Observation Badge
 Honour Goblet of the Luftwaffe (Ehrenpokal der Luftwaffe) on 10 August 1942 as Leutnant and pilot
 Italian Silver Medal of Military Valor
 German Cross in Gold on 9 September 1942 as Leutnant in the III./Jagdgeschwader 27
 Iron Cross (1939)
 2nd class (19 April 1941)
 1st class (9 September 1941)
 Knight's Cross of the Iron Cross with Oak Leaves and Swords
 Knight's Cross on 20 October 1942 as Leutnant (war officer) and Staffelführer of the 8./Jagdgeschwader 27
 268th Oak Leaves on 2 August 1943 as Hauptmann (war officer) and Gruppenkommandeur of the II./Jagdgeschwader 27
 (144th) Swords on 19 April 1945 as Major (war officer) and Geschwaderkommodore of Jagdgeschwader 3 "Udet"

Dates of rank

Notes

References

Citations

Bibliography

 
 
 
 
 
 
 Musciano, Walter (1989).    Messerschmitt Aces 	Tab Books  
 
 
 
 
 
 
 
 
 
 
 
 Roba, Jean-Louis & Pegg, Martin (2003). Jagdwaffe Vol 4, Sec2: The Mediterranean 1942 - 1943  Hersham, Surrey: Ian Allan Publishing   incl colour picture of aircraft (p. 168)
 
 
 
 
 
 Spick, Mike (2006).   Aces of the Reich.   	Greenhill Books.    .
 
 
 Sundin, Claes & Bergström. Christer (1997). Luftwaffe Fighter Aircraft in Profile.  Altglen, PA: Schiffer Military History.   incl colour profile of aircraft (#16)
 
 Weal, John (1999). 	Bf109F/G/K Aces of the Western Front.   Oxford: Osprey Publishing Ltd.  .
 
 
 Weal, John (2006). 	Bf109 Defence of the Reich Aces. 	Oxford: Osprey Publishing Ltd.	.
 

1918 births
1985 deaths
Luftwaffe pilots
German World War II flying aces
Recipients of the Silver Medal of Military Valor
Recipients of the Gold German Cross
German prisoners of war in World War II held by the United Kingdom
Recipients of the Knight's Cross of the Iron Cross with Oak Leaves and Swords
People from the Rhine Province
Reich Labour Service members
Military personnel from Mülheim